The Rocky Mountain locust (Melanoplus spretus) is an extinct species of grasshopper that ranged through the western half of the United States and some western portions of Canada with large numbers seen until the end of the 19th century.

Less than 30 years later, the species was apparently extinct. The last recorded sighting of a live specimen was in 1902 in southern Canada. Because a creature so ubiquitous was not expected to become extinct, very few specimens were ever collected (though a few preserved remains have been found in Knife Point Glacier, Wyoming and Grasshopper Glacier, Montana).

Rocky Mountain locusts were a part of the diet of the critically endangered or possibly extinct Eskimo curlew (Numenius borealis) on its spring migration and the extinction of the locust has been speculated as being a factor in the decline of the curlew.

Taxonomy
The species name was formally published with the Latin binomial Caloptenus spretus in 1866 by B.D. Walsh as named by "Mr. Uhler, without describing it," adding that "The name 'spretus' means 'despised', and refers apparently to its having been hitherto despised or overlooked by Entomologists". Walsh does not provide a description of the species, except for female wing length, as well as some aspects of biology, ecology, and control. Some entomologists credit the authority for the binomial Caloptenus spretus to C. Thomas, but fails on the Principle of Priority. The treatment under the genus Melanoplus began in 1878 in publications by S. H. Scudder who pointed out the difference between the genus Caloptenus that he noted as being more correctly spelled Calliptenus and Melanoplus. The species is reported to have descended from the Rocky Mountains to the prairie in large numbers only in certain years, particularly in dry seasons, following westward wind currents. Outbreaks usually lasted two consecutive years. Although a great number of eggs were laid on the prairie during outbreak years, individuals hatched from these eggs usually did not thrive, a condition that has been attributed to the lack of adaptation of this species to prairie habitats. A 2004 molecular phylogenetic study that used mitochondrial DNA from specimens obtained from museums and fragments preserved in frozen glacial deposits confirms the placement in the genus Melanoplus and the distinctiveness as a species (ie not a migratory form of an extant species). It also identified the closest living relative as Melanoplus bruneri rather than Melanoplus sanguinipes as had been earlier surmised.

Distribution and habitat

The Rocky Mountain locust occurred along both sides of the Rocky Mountains and in most of the prairie areas. Breeding in sandy areas and thriving in hot and dry conditions, it has been hypothesized that they may have depended on the tall grass prairie plants during drier spells. The destruction of the prairie habitat and the incursion of new flora and fauna along with agricultural practices may have led to the extinction of the species. Large numbers of grasshoppers including a large number of Rocky Mountain locusts entombed in the ice in the Rocky Mountains gave their name to the Grasshopper Glacier.

Extinction
Rocky Mountain locusts caused farm damage in Maine from 1743 to 1756 and Vermont in 1797–1798. The locusts became more of a problem in the 19th century, as farming expanded westward into the grasshoppers' favored habitat. Outbreaks of varying severity emerged in 1828, 1838, 1846, and 1855, affecting areas throughout the West. Plagues visited Minnesota in 1856–1857 and again in 1865, and Nebraska suffered repeated infestations between 1856 and 1874.

The last major swarms of Rocky Mountain locust were between 1873 and 1877, when the locust caused $200 million in crop damage in Colorado, Kansas, Minnesota, Missouri, Nebraska and other states.  One farmer reported that the locusts seemed "like a great white cloud, like a snowstorm, blocking out the sun like vapor". The locusts ate not only the grass and valuable crops, but also leather, wood, sheep's wool, and—in extreme cases—even clothes off peoples' backs. Trains were sometimes brought to a halt after skidding over large numbers of locusts run over on the rails. As the swarms worsened, farmers attempted to control them using gunpowder, fires (sometimes dug in trenches to burn as many of the locusts as possible), smearing them with "hopperdozers", a type of plow device pulled behind horses that had a shield that knocked jumping locusts into a pan of liquid poison or fuel, even sucking them into vacuum cleaner–like contraptions, but all of these were ultimately ineffective in stopping the hordes. Charles Valentine Riley, a Missouri entomologist, came up with a recipe for locusts seasoned with salt and pepper and pan-fried in butter. The recipe sold, but some stated that they "would just as soon starve as eat those horrible creatures". Farmers finally responded in force to the swarm's destruction; an 1877 Nebraska law said that anyone between the ages of 16 and 60 had to work at least two days eliminating locusts at hatching time or face a $10 fine. That same year Missouri offered a bounty of $1 a bushel for locusts collected in March, 50 cents a bushel in April, 25 cents in May, and 10 cents in June. Other Great Plains states made similar bounty offers. In the 1880s farmers had recovered sufficiently from their locust woes to be able to send carloads of corn to flood victims in Ohio. They also switched to such resilient crops as winter wheat, which matured in the early summer, before locusts were able to migrate. These new agricultural practices effectively reduced the threat of locusts and greatly contributed to the species' downfall.

It has been hypothesized that plowing and irrigation by settlers as well as trampling by cattle and other farm animals near streams and rivers in the Rocky Mountains destroyed their eggs in the areas they permanently lived, which ultimately caused their demise. For example, reports from this era suggest that farmers killed over 150 egg cases per square inch while plowing, harrowing or flooding. It appeared that this species lived and reproduced in the prairie only temporarily during swarming years, with each generation being smaller than the previous one and swarming ever further from the Rocky Mountains, while the permanent breeding grounds of this species seemed to be restricted to an area somewhere between 3 and 3,000 square miles of sandy soils near streams and rivers in the Rockies, which coincided with arable and pastoral lands exploited by settlers.

Because locusts are a form of grasshopper that appear when grasshopper populations reach high densities, it was theorized that M. spretus might not be extinct, that "solitary phase" individuals of a migratory grasshopper might be able to turn into the Rocky Mountain locust given the right environmental conditions; however, breeding experiments using many grasshopper species in high-density environments failed to invoke the famous insect. The status of M. spretus as a distinct species was confirmed by a 2004 DNA analysis of North American species of the genus Melanoplus.

Melanoplus spretus was formally declared extinct by the IUCN in 2014. It has been suggested that the now critically endangered Eskimo curlew fed on the locust during its spring migration and that its extinction may have added to the pressures on already declining curlew populations including hunting and the conversion of its grassland habitat to agriculture.

In culture

Grasshopper Chapel in Cold Spring, Minnesota, was established in 1877 by immigrant German Catholic farmers, supposedly to keep away future locust ravages which had occurred from the 1870s. The Feast of St Magnus, the patron of farmers, on September 6 was changed to Grasshopper day.

A fictionalized description of the devastation created by Rocky Mountain locusts in the 1870s can be found in the 1937 novel On the Banks of Plum Creek by Laura Ingalls Wilder. Her description was based on actual incidents in western Minnesota during the summers of 1874 and 1875 as the locusts destroyed her family's wheat crop.

Another vivid portrayal of the depredations of the locust can be found in Ole Edvart Rølvaag's Giants in the Earth, based in part on his own experiences and those of his wife's family.

In 2018, a chamber opera about the Rocky Mountain locust named Locust: The Opera premiered in Wyoming, USA. The libretto for the opera was written by professor and author Jeffrey Lockwood who adapted it from his book Locust: the Devastating Rise and Mysterious Disappearance of the Insect that Shaped the American Frontier.

See also
 Locust Plague of 1874
 List of recently extinct insects
 Mormon cricket
 Passenger pigeon

References

Citations

General references 
 
 
 
 

Extinct animals of North America
Extinct insects since 1500
Insects described in 1866
Taxa named by Benjamin Dann Walsh
Insects of North America
Locusts
Species made extinct by human activities